Michael Joseph Boulette (born June 4, 1950) is an American prelate of the Roman Catholic Church who has been serving as an auxiliary bishop for the Archdiocese of San Antonio in Texas since 2017.

Biography

Early life 
Michael J. Boulette was born in Hudson Falls, New York, on June 4, 1950. He holds the following academic degrees:

 Bachelor of Psychology cum laude from St. Mary's University in San Antonio, Texas (1971)
 Master of Psychology from Trinity University in San Antonio (1972), 
 Master of Divinity from the University of Notre Dame in Notre Dame, Indiana(1975),
 Doctor of Preaching and Worship from the Austin Presbyterian Theological Seminary in Austin, Texas (1993).

Priesthood 
On March 19, 1976, Boulette was ordained to the priesthood by Archbishop Francis James Furey for the Archdiocese of San Antonio.  Boulette was the founding director of St. Peter Upon the Water, a training center for Catholic spiritual directors in Ingram, Texas. On March 10, 2005, Boulette was granted the title of monsignor by Pope John Paul II.

Auxiliary Bishop of San Antonio
Pope Francis appointed Boulette as titular bishop of Hieronan and as an auxiliary bishop for the Archdiocese of San Antonio on January 23, 2017. Boulette was consecrated on March 20, 2017, by Archbishop Gustavo Garcia-Siller.

See also

 Catholic Church hierarchy
 Catholic Church in the United States
 Historical list of the Catholic bishops of the United States
 List of Catholic bishops of the United States
 Lists of patriarchs, archbishops, and bishops

References

External links
Roman Catholic Archdiocese of San Antonio

Episcopal succession

1950 births
Living people
People from Hudson Falls, New York
21st-century American Roman Catholic titular bishops
Roman Catholic Archdiocese of San Antonio
Catholics from New York (state)
Bishops appointed by Pope Francis